Patrick Omgba Ada (born 14 January 1985) is a Cameroonian former professional footballer and convicted rapist.

During his career, which lasted between 2004 and 2012, Ada played as a defender. He notably represented Kilmarnock in the Scottish Premier League, and played in the Football League for Barnet, Exeter City, Crewe Alexandra and Burton Albion. He also played in Non-league football with Redbridge, St Albans City, Histon and Ebbsfleet United.

Ada was released by Ebbsfleet in December 2012 after he was sentenced to five years in prison for rape.

Career
Ada made 94 appearances over two years with Histon, helping them chase promotion.

He signed with Crewe Alexandra in the summer of 2009, making him Crewe's first signing in the summer transfer window. He was released from the club in May 2011.

On 21 June 2011, Ada signed for Scottish Premier League club Kilmarnock. Ada made his debut on 24 July 2011 at Tannadice in a 1–1 draw with Dundee United. On 30 August, it was announced that Kilmarnock would let Ada leave on a free transfer, in order to ease the club's wage bill. 

On 23 February 2012, after training for a week with Burton Albion, Ada signed a contract until the end of the season with the League Two side. Ada joined Conference National side Ebbsfleet United in the summer of 2012 and went on to make 19 league appearances and played his final game on 4 December in a 4–2 home defeat by Cambridge United before being released after being jailed for rape.

Personal life
Ada was arrested in March 2012, in the connection to an allegation of rape.

On 12 December Ada was sentenced to five years in prison after being convicted of raping a woman in Southwark, London on 1 March 2012.

References

External links
Crewe Alexandra profile

1985 births
Living people
Cameroonian footballers
Association football defenders
Barnet F.C. players
Histon F.C. players
Exeter City F.C. players
Crewe Alexandra F.C. players
Kilmarnock F.C. players
Burton Albion F.C. players
Ebbsfleet United F.C. players
English Football League players
National League (English football) players
Scottish Premier League players